Peter Przygodda (26 October 1941 – 2 October 2011) was a German filmmaker, best known for editing Wim Wenders' films. Przygodda died of cancer, aged 69, in 2011.

Filmography

Director
 1969: Der Besuch auf dem Lande (short)
 1972: Can
 1979: … als Diesel geboren
 1981–1985: Alle Geister kreisen… Todos os espiritos circulam

Editor

 1969: 
 1970: Summer in the City
 1970: 
 1971: Cream – Schwabing-Report
 1971: Liebe so schön wie Liebe
 1972: The Goalkeeper's Fear of the Penalty
 1972: Ludwig: Requiem for a Virgin King
 1973: The Scarlet Letter
 1973: Sylvie
 1974: Alice in the Cities
 1974: Paul – Geschichte eines Ausgestoßenen
 1974: Ein bißchen Liebe
 1975: The Wrong Move
 1975: The Lost Honour of Katharina Blum
 1975: Teenager-Liebe
 1976: The Sternstein Manor
 1976: Kings of the Road
 1977: The American Friend
 1977: The Left-Handed Woman
 1978: The Glass Cell
 1978: Knife in the Head
 1978: The Man in the Rushes
 1980: Lightning Over Water
 1980: 
 1982: The State of Things
 1982: The Magic Mountain
 1982: 
 1983: 
 1984: Fluchtpunkt Berlin
 1984: Paris, Texas
 1986: Miko: From the Gutter to the Stars
 1987: Wings of Desire
 1987: Deadline
 1988: 
 1989: Last Exit to Brooklyn
 1991: Until the End of the World
 1992: The Absence
 1993: Faraway, So Close!
 1994: Lisbon Story
 1995: Transatlantis
 1995: Beyond the Clouds
 1995: Deathmaker
 1995: A Trick of Light
 1996: The Ogre
 1996: Snakes and Ladders
 1997: The End of Violence
 1998: Palmetto
 1998: Kopfleuchten
 2000: 
 2000: The Legend of Rita
 2002: Tattoo
 2005: Schneeland
 2005: Don't Come Knocking
 2006: Strike
 2007: Eight Miles High
 2008: Palermo Shooting
 2009: Mazel Tov

Awards 
 1975: Filmband in Gold (film editing): Falsche Bewegung
 1978: Filmband in Gold (film editing): Der amerikanische Freund, Die linkshändige Frau und Die gläserne Zelle
 2005: Nominated for European Film Award " Don't Come Knocking"
 2009: Nominated for Deutscher Filmpreis: Palermo Shooting
 2010: Star on Boulevard der Stars in Berlin

Literature
Hans-Michael Bock: Peter Przygodda – Cutter, Regisseur. Essay von Karlheinz Oplustil in CineGraph – Lexikon zum deutschsprachigen Film, pg. 12 (September 1988)
Kay Weniger: Das große Personenlexikon des Films. Sechster Band. Schwarzkopf & Schwarzkopf Verlag, Berlin 2001;

References

External links
 

Film people from Berlin
Deaths from cancer in Germany
1941 births
2011 deaths